Lukas Jonsson (born 21 October 1992) is a Swedish professional footballer who plays as a goalkeeper for Danish 2nd Division club Esbjerg fB.

References

1992 births
Living people
Swedish footballers
Swedish expatriate footballers
Ettan Fotboll players
Superettan players
Allsvenskan players
Norwegian First Division players
Danish 1st Division players
IF Sylvia players
IK Sirius Fotboll players
Mjøndalen IF players
Vendsyssel FF players
Esbjerg fB players
Association football goalkeepers
Swedish expatriate sportspeople in Norway
Expatriate footballers in Norway
Swedish expatriate sportspeople in Denmark
Expatriate men's footballers in Denmark